Hamro Party  (lit. Our Party; HP) is a political party based in Darjeeling district and Kalimpong district of India. HP was founded on 25 November 2021. The president of the party is Ajoy Edwards, who was earlier a leader of Gorkha National Liberation Front.

Election history
HP contested the Darjeeling Municipality election in February 2022. It won 18 seats out of a total of 32 seats and formed the board. HP contested all 45 seats in the Gorkhaland Territorial Administration election held on 26 June 2022 and won 8 seats. Two HP councillors of the GTA joined Bharatiya Gorkha Prajatantrik Morcha on 5 November 2022. Six HP ward commissioners of Darjeeling Municipality joined Bharatiya Gorkha Prajatantrik Morcha on 24 November 2022.

References

Political parties in India